Meydancık (original Georgian name დიობანი, Diobani) is a village in Imerkhevi in Şavşat District, Artvin Province, Turkey. Its population is 382 (2021). Before the 2013 reorganisation, it was a town (belde). Meydancık is the official name given by Turkish authorities in 1925, it literally means "the small square / field".

Meydancık is also a name of vicinity which includes thirteen villages:
Maden (Badzgireti)
Demirci (Daba)
Dereiçi (Dasamoba)
Erikli (Agara)
Çukur (Chikhori)
Sebzeli (Jvariskhevi)
Çağlayan (Khevtsvirili)
Çağlıpınar (Khokhlevi)
Yeşilce (Manatba)
Oba (Ube)
Dutlu (Surevani)
Yağlı (Zakieti)
Tepebaşı (Ziosi)

References

Tao-Klarjeti
Villages in Şavşat District